The Battle of Round Mountain was the first battle in the Trail of Blood on Ice campaign for the control of Indian Territory during the American Civil War that occurred on November 19, 1861.  Its main purpose was to prevent Union supporters of the Creek Nation, led by Opothleyahola from fleeing Indian Territory to the protection of Union forces in Kansas. 

The physical location of the battle is in dispute. Some historians believe it to be near Keystone while others contend that it is near Yale, Oklahoma. The event is sometimes referred to as the Battle of Red Fork.

Events
Col. Douglas H. Cooper, Confederate commander of the Indian Department, was unable to reconcile differences with Opothleyahola, commander of a band of Unionist Creeks and Seminoles. Opothleyahola" group was estimated to number about seventeen hundred people, and also included some Union supporters from the Comanches, Delawares, Kickapoos, Wichitas, and Shawnees.  Cooper set out on November 15, 1861, with about 1,400 men either to compel Opothleyahola 's submission or "drive him and his party from the country."  Cooper's force rode up the Deep Fork of the Canadian River to find Opothleyahola's camp deserted. On November 19, Cooper learned from captured prisoners that part of Opothleyahola's band was erecting a fort at the Red Fork of the Arkansas River.

Cooper's men arrived there around 4:00 p.m. Charging cavalry discovered that Opothleyahola's followers had recently abandoned their camp. The Confederates located and followed stragglers; the 4th Texas blundered into Opothleyahola's warriors on the tree line at the foot of the Round Mountains. The Federal response chased the Confederate cavalry back to Cooper's main force. Darkness prevented Cooper's counterattack until the main enemy force was within . After a short fight, Opothleyahola's men set fire to the prairie grass and retreated.

The following morning, Cooper advanced on Opothleyahola's new camp but found that the Federal forces had fled. The Confederates claimed victory because Opothleyahola had left the area. The Confederates captured abandoned supplies, such as  Opothleyahola's carriage, a dozen wagons, food, cattle and ponies. The Confederate loss in the engagement was 1 captain and 5 men killed, 3 severely and 1 slightly wounded, and 1 missing. Opothleyahola lost about 110 killed and wounded.

This was the first of three encounters between Opothleyahola's Union bands and Confederate troops. The Unionists were forced to flee to Kansas after the Battle of Chustenahlah at the end of the year.

Battle site controversy
The site of this event has been disputed for many years, with two locations emerging as the leading choices. One is near the present day town of Yale, Oklahoma. The other is close to the former site of Keystone (which is now submerged by the waters of Keystone Lake). Angie Debo, a noted Oklahoma historian, wrote an article describing the evidence for and against each site. She concluded that the evidence pointed more strongly to the Yale site.

Order of battle

Confederate
Cooper's Brigade - Col. Douglas H. Cooper
6 companies, 1st Regiment Choctaw-Chickasaw Mounted Rifles - Maj. Mitchell Laflore
Detachment, 1st Creek Mounted Rifles - Col. Daniel N. McIntosh
Detachment, 2nd Creek Mounted Rifles - Lt. Col. Chilly McIntosh
Detachment, Seminole Indians - Maj. John Jumper
Detachment, 9th Texas Cavalry - Lt. Col. William Quayle

Union
Creek and Seminole Indians - Opothleyahola
Lockapoka Creeks
Muscogee Creeks
Seminoles - Halleck Tustenuggee, Sonuk Mikko

See also

 Trail of Blood on Ice
 List of battles fought in Oklahoma

Notes

References

CWSAC Battle Summary
 Debo, Angie. "The Site of the Battle of Round Mountain, 1861", Chronicles of Oklahoma, Vol. XXVII, No. 2 (Summer, 1949), pp. 187–206.
 DeMoss, Robert W.  State of thieves: Detailing the truth of the first battles of the Civil War in Indian Territory. [Cleveland, Okla.] : R.W. DeMoss, 2004.
 O'Brien, William M.  A time of decision: the Indian Territory in the first year of the Civil War, August, 1861 through early 1862.  Jenks, OK : The Author, 1997.
 U.S. War Department, The War of the Rebellion: A Compilation of the Official Records of the Union and Confederate Armies, 70 volumes in 4 series. Washington, D.C.: United States Government Printing Office, 1880-1901. Series 1, Volume 8, Part 1, pages 5–10.
 White, Christine Schultz and White, Benton R., Now The Wolf Has Come: The Creek Nation in the Civil War, Texas A & M University Press, 1996. .
 Wright, Muriel H. "General Douglas H. Cooper, C.S.A.", Chronicles of Oklahoma, vol. XXXII, No. 2 (Summer, 1954), pp. 142–184.

External links
Creek Indians in the American Civil War

Battles of the Trans-Mississippi Theater of the American Civil War
Trail of Blood on Ice
Confederate victories of the American Civil War
Battles of the American Civil War in Indian Territory
Payne County, Oklahoma
Pre-statehood history of Oklahoma
November 1861 events
1861 in Indian Territory
1861 in the American Civil War
American Civil War orders of battle